The Little Sucker River is a  stream in St. Louis County, Minnesota, flowing directly into Lake Superior.

See also
List of rivers of Minnesota

References

Minnesota Watersheds
USGS Hydrologic Unit Map - State of Minnesota (1974)

Rivers of St. Louis County, Minnesota
Rivers of Minnesota
Tributaries of Lake Superior